The 1990 Australian Production Car Championship was an Australian motor racing title for Group 3E Series Production Cars. It has been recognised by the Confederation of Australian Motor Sport as the fourth Australian Production Car Championship.

After Production Car racing was dominated by the turbocharged Mitsubishi Starion, Mazda RX-7 and Toyota Supras from 1984 until 1989, CAMS banned turbo and V8 engined cars from 1990 in a bid to bring public interest back into the series. The dominant competitors in the championship were the Australian built Holden Commodores and Ford Falcons powered by naturally aspirated six cylinder engines.

The championship was won by Kent Youlden driving a Ford Falcon EA S.

Schedule
The championship was contested over eight rounds with one race per round.

Points system
Points were awarded on a 20-15-12-10-8-6-4-3-2-1 basis to the top ten placegetters in each round.
Only the best seven round results were used to determine a drivers final pointscore, any other points being discarded.

Championship standings

References

Australian Production Car Championship
Production Car Championship